Edling is a village and a municipality in the district of Rosenheim in Bavaria in Germany.

References

Rosenheim (district)